Jayden Ojeda (born 31 July 1999) is an Australian racing driver from Sydney, Australia. He is currently competing in the Dunlop Super2 Series with MW Motorsport, driving the No. 31 Nissan Altima L33.

Racing record

Career summary

* Season still in progress

Super2 Series results
(key) (Race results only)

Supercars Championship results

Complete Bathurst 1000 results

References

External links

V8 Supercars Official Profile
Profile on Racing Reference

1999 births
Racing drivers from Sydney
Living people
Supercars Championship drivers
Matt Stone Racing drivers
Andretti Autosport drivers
United Autosports drivers
Garry Rogers Motorsport drivers
Australian F4 Championship drivers